Ann-Christin Strack (born 20 December 1993) is a German bobsledder.

She participated at the IBSF World Championships 2019, winning a medal.

References

External links
 
 
 
 
 Ann-Christin Strack at the Bob und Schlittenverband Deutschland 

1993 births
Living people
Sportspeople from Giessen
German female bobsledders
21st-century German women